Tareh-ye Ashayiri (also Romanized as Ţareḥ-ye ʿAshāyīrī) is a village in Rudkhaneh Bar Rural District, Rudkhaneh District, Rudan County, Hormozgan Province, Iran. At the 2006 census, its population was 19, in 5 families.

References 

Populated places in Rudan County